Hunjiang may refer to:

Hunjiang City, former name of Baishan, Jilin, China
Hunjiang District, in Baishan, Jilin, China
The Hun River, tributary of the Yalu River